The Gamspleisspitze  (German, also Gemspleisspitze) or Paraid Naira (Romansh) is a mountain of the Silvretta Alps, located on the border between Austria and Switzerland. From this peak, the border approaching south from the Fluchthorn departs east to intersect the neighboring valley in an Austrian lower (north) part named Fimbatal and an uninhabited Swiss upper (south) part, named Val Fenga. On the Austrian west site lies the also uninhabited Larein valley.

References

External links
 Paraid Naira/Gemspleisspitze on Hikr

Alpine three-thousanders
Austria–Switzerland border
International mountains of Europe
Mountains of Tyrol (state)
Mountains of the Alps
Mountains of Switzerland
Mountains of Graubünden
Silvretta Alps
Valsot